Fairlie may refer to:

People 
 Fairlie (surname)
 Fairlie Dalphatado (1924–2010), Sri Lankan cricketer
 Fairlie Harmar (1876–1945), English painter

Places 
 Fairlies Knob National Park, in Queensland, Australia
 Fairlie, New Zealand, a town in the South Island of New Zealand
 Fairlie, North Ayrshire, a village in North Ayrshire, Scotland
 Fairlie–Poplar, Atlanta, United States
 Fairlie, Texas, United States

Other uses 
 Fairlie locomotive, a type of railway steam locomotive
 Fairlie (1810 ship)
 the Fairlie Mortar, a design of anti-submarine mortar

See also